Liu Jiashen (born 23 November 1991 in Qingdao) is a Chinese football player who plays as a defender for Qingdao Hainiu F.C..

Club career
In 2011, Liu Jiashen started his professional footballer career with Shanghai Greenland Shenhua in the Chinese Super League. He would eventually make his league debut for Shenhua on 18 June 2011 in a game against Hangzhou Greentown, coming on as a substitute for Feng Renliang in the 86th minute as the match ended in a 1–0 defeat. His time at Shenhua would see him struggle to gain much more playing time and by the 2015 league season he would leave the club to return to his hometown and join second-tier football team Qingdao Huanghai. He would eventually make his debut for Qingdao on 13 April 2016 in a Chinese FA Cup game against Lijiang Jiayunhao that ended in a 2–1 defeat. While he would score in his league debut for the club on 28 October 2017 against Meizhou Hakka in a 2–1 defeat, Liu would still find himself as a peripheral figure within the team until the Head coach Jordi Vinyals decided to hand Liu his first league start on 6 April 2019 against Heilongjiang Lava Spring that ended in a 3–0 victory. After that game Liu would become an integral member of the team that would win the 2019 China League One division and promotion into the top tier.

At the end of the 2021 Chinese Super League campaign he would be part of the squad that was relegated. On 28 April 2022 he would join second tier football club Shaanxi Chang'an Athletic on a free transfer. After only a handful of games he would leave Shaanxi to transfer to another second tier club in Qingdao Hainiu F.C. on 1 August 2022. He would go on to establish himself as regular within the team that gained promotion to the top tier at the end of the 2022 China League One campaign.

Career statistics 
Statistics accurate as of match played 25 December 2022.

Honours

Club
Qingdao Huanghai
China League One: 2019

References

External links
 

1991 births
Living people
Chinese footballers
Footballers from Qingdao
Shanghai Shenhua F.C. players
Qingdao F.C. players
Chinese Super League players
China League One players
Association football defenders
21st-century Chinese people